Women In Criminal Law (WICL) is an organisation founded in 2018 to promote and support women in the legal profession, both defence and prosecution. It was founded by Katy Thorne QC following concerns that too few women reached top appointments in law.

History
WICL was set up by Katy Thorne QC, following concerns that too few women reached top appointments in criminal law. Heather Hallett, then Vice-President of the Court of Appeal Criminal Division, is the patron. Mrs Justice  Bobbie Cheema-Grubb joined because "excellent, experienced lawyers are leaving the profession". Other founding members include Alison Saunders.

Initiatives and events
The organisation set up mentoring schemes, where small groups of women are connected with a female judge.

During the COVID-19 pandemic, hearings dropped, many solicitors were furloughed and barristers’ finances reduced. In response, WiCL created an online "Corona-initiative".

At its first anniversary they celebrated the Sex Disqualification (Removal) Act 1919.

See also
Women in law in the United Kingdom

References

Organizations established in 2018
Women in law
Law of the United Kingdom